Edwin Albrecht Uehling (January 27, 1901 Lowell, Wisconsin  – May 18, 1985) was an American theoretical physicist known for the formulation of the Uehling potential to describe vacuum polarization in quantum electrodynamics. He also worked in condensed matter physics, particularly in the field of ferroelectricity.

Life 
After his bachelor's degree from the University of Wisconsin in 1925, he worked at Bell Telephone Laboratories in radio frequency communication, where he wrote several patents. He received his PhD from the University of Michigan in 1932 on the quantum theory of transport processes, advised by George Uhlenbeck. His research lead to his famous paper on vacuum polarization and the formulation of the now-called Uehling potential. As described by Uehling theory, the effects of vacuum polarization were later confirmed with the discovery of the Lamb shift in 1947.

After his PhD he left for a ten-month collaboration with Werner Heisenberg in the Institute of Theoretical Physics in Leipzig. When Uehling returned to the United States, he took a position at RCA Laboratories. In 1934, he went to work with J. Robert Oppenheimer in Berkeley and Pasadena funded by the National Research Council.

During World War II, Uehling was recruited as a member of the antisubmarine warfare operations research group of the Tenth Fleet. He was awarded the US President's Certificate of Merit by the United States government in early 1947 for his scientific contributions to the team.

Uehling was also interested in condensed matter physics, nuclear magnetic resonance and ferroelectrics. He codeveloped the Senko–Uehling–Schmidt theory of ferroelectricity to describe .

He worked in the University of Washington since 1936, he formally retired in 1971, but continued to work as emeritus professor until 1984. He was elected in 1941 a Fellow of the American Physical Society. He was a Guggenheim Fellow for the academic year 1955–1956.

During post-war related tensions and the investigations of espionage related to the Manhattan Project, president of the University of Washington Henry Schmitz denied professorship to Oppenheimer in 1954. Uehling, then the chairman of the physics department, tried various times to revert the president decision. Uehling appealed to the university senate with a speech on academic freedom. The university committee ruled against the university president and Oppenheimer was allowed lectureship. Schmitz later apologized to Oppenheimer in 1956.

See also 
 Quantum Boltzmann equation

References

Notes 

1901 births
1985 deaths
University of Wisconsin alumni
20th-century American physicists
University of Washington faculty
Fellows of the American Physical Society